The excised slitshell, scientific name †Gyrotoma excisa, was a species of freshwater snail, an aquatic gastropod mollusk in the family Pleuroceridae. This species was endemic to the United States. It is now extinct.

References

Pleuroceridae
Extinct gastropods
Gastropods described in 1843
Taxonomy articles created by Polbot